Aldona is a Lithuanian and Polish feminine given name. Individuals bearing the name Aldona include:
 Aldona of Lithuania (1333–1339), Queen consort of Poland, princess of the Grand Duchy of Lithuania
 Aldona Čiukšytė (born 1944), Lithuanian rower
 Aldona Klimavičiūtė (born 1940), Lithuanian rower
 Aldona Margenytė, Lithuanian rower
 Aldona Młyńczak (born 1958), Polish politician
 Aldona Nenėnienė (born 1949), Lithuanian handball player
 Aldona Wos (born 1955), Polish-American politician

References 

Lithuanian feminine given names
Polish feminine given names
Feminine given names